Kenneth Leroy Roberts Jr. (born July 25, 1973, in Mountain View, California) is an American former professional Grand Prix motorcycle road racer who won the 2000 FIM Road Racing World Championship, after finishing runner-up in . Roberts Jr. is an 8-time Premier Class race winner. He joins his father Kenny Roberts as the only father-son duo to have won 500cc World Championships. Roberts was inducted into the F.I.M. MotoGP Hall of Fame in 2017.

Career

Early years
Roberts first raced in the 250cc class at Willow Springs in 1990, winning 5 races in his debut season in road racing. By 1993, he made his World 500cc debut at the Laguna Seca Raceway event, and was a full-time 250cc racer for 1994 and 1995 with the Marlboro-Yamaha team.

Team Roberts
Roberts moved up to 500cc World Championship racing with Yamaha in 1996. He finished his debut season in 500cc in 13th position overall and Yamaha decided not to renew his contract. He then joined his father's team in 1997, spending two years developing their Modenas two-stroke bike. In those two years, he struggled to get into the top position, finishing 16th and 13th respectively in 1997 and 1998.

Suzuki years

In 1999, Suzuki signed him to their Grand Prix team. His debut race with Suzuki in Malaysia resulted in a surprise win, defeating the reigning champion, Michael Doohan. He went on to win the second race in Japan, where he again defeated Doohan. This winning streak put him as a strong contender to challenge Doohan for the championship. However, Doohan retired due to injuries suffered in an accident on the third race in Spain. Afterwards, the main challenge for the championship came from Doohan's teammate, Àlex Crivillé. Roberts failed to find consistency during the rest of the season, notching only two more wins and another four podiums. His lead in the championship subsequently was taken over by Crivillé, who later went on to win the title. Roberts would finish a respectable second in the championship.

He renewed his championship challenge in 2000. With Crivillé failing to regain his form, Roberts' main challenge came from Valentino Rossi, a rookie rider fresh from winning the 250cc title. This time, Roberts managed to find consistency by taking four wins and five podiums in 16 races. Roberts clinched his first title, two races before the end of the season, at the Rio Grand Prix after finishing 6th, although Rossi won the race. He became the first son of a former champion to also win the title. His victory also meant Suzuki broke Honda's six-year championship win streak.

In 2001, Roberts and Suzuki faced a tough task to defend the title. With Rossi dominating the series to win the title, Roberts only managed a single podium and finished the season in disappointing 11th position. This also marked the end of the two-stroke 500cc bike era as the regulations changed for 2002

Between 2002 and 2005, Roberts faced a difficult time in developing the new four-stroke 990cc Suzuki GSV-R bike to challenge Honda and Yamaha. He was also being challenged by his younger teammate, John Hopkins, who often outperformed him. Even in 2003 and 2004, Hopkins managed to finish the season ahead of Roberts. During the 4-year period, Roberts managed to gain only two podiums, one in 2002 and one in 2005. At the end of 2005, Suzuki decided not to renew Roberts' contract and opted for a younger rider in Chris Vermeulen.

Return to Team Roberts
He returned to his father's team in 2006. Honda provided the RC211V V5 engine with the frame being designed by Team Roberts and the bike subsequently named KR211V. He took his first podium of the season at Catalunya, having started on the front row.

A run of five successive top-five grid positions in mid-season showed the bike's promise. He again finished 3rd at Estoril, having led with one lap to go. Kenny later explained that he had miscounted the number of laps, and when he came onto the final straight with one lap to go, he expected to see the chequered flag, and that this distracted him and prevented him blocking Toni Elías' passing move. With these two podium finishes, he finished 6th in the standings at the end of the year, aided by riders such as Casey Stoner and Sete Gibernau missing races. This was Roberts' best result since winning the championship in 2000.

Roberts remained on his father's team at the start of 2007. However, 2007 again marked a new era as 990cc bike were replaced with an 800cc displacement formula. He rode the KR212V bike which are using the RC212V's V4 engine supplied by Honda. The 2007 season was less successful, due to Honda concentrating on improving the underperforming Repsol Honda factory machine. After only 4 points in the first part of the season, Kenny Jr. stopped racing midseason, replaced by his brother Kurtis, and never returned in 2007. Both Kenny and the entire team did not participate in 2008 season.

Career statistics

Grand Prix motorcycle racing

By season

Races by year
(key) (Races in bold indicate pole position, races in italics indicate fastest lap)

References

External links

 
Official website of Team Roberts
Kenny Roberts Jr profile on Motorcycle Racing Online

1975 births
Living people
500cc World Championship riders
MotoGP World Championship riders
American motorcycle racers
Sportspeople from California
People from Mountain View, California
Suzuki MotoGP riders
500cc World Riders' Champions